Farysia is a genus of fungi belonging to the family Farysiaceae.

The genus has cosmopolitan distribution.

Species

Species:
 Farysia acheniorum 
 Farysia americana 
 Farysia backerii

References

Fungi